Robert Marchand may refer to:
Robert Marchand (athlete) (1904–1983), French Olympic hurdler
Robert Marchand (cyclist) (1911–2021), French cyclist
Robert Marchand (director), Australian film director